Köklüce is a Turkish place name that may refer to the following places in Turkey:

 Köklüce, Gerger, a village in the district of Gerger, Adıyaman Province
 Köklüce, Palu
 Köklüce, Yüreğir, a village in the district of Yüreğir, Adana Province

Köklüce is also the Turkish name of Venets, Shumen Province.